Warayut Klomnak (born  May 30, 1986) is a Thai professional footballer who plays as a forward.

External links
https://us.soccerway.com/players/warayut-klomnak/535466/
https://www.livesoccer888.com/thaipremierleague/2018/teams/Air-Force-Central/Players/Warayut-Klomnak
http://player.7mth.com/1774021/index.shtml
https://www.smmsport.com/reader/news/208007

1986 births
Living people
Warayut Klomnak
Warayut Klomnak
Warayut Klomnak
Association football forwards
Warayut Klomnak
Warayut Klomnak
Warayut Klomnak